Craugastor longirostris is a species of frog in the family Craugastoridae. It is found in Ecuador from the Guayas Province northwards to western Colombia extreme eastern Panama, with isolated populations in the Magdalena Valley, Colombia. 
Its natural habitats are lowland and submontane rainforests, occasionally dry forests. It is potentially threatened by habitat loss.

References

longirostris
Amphibians of Colombia
Amphibians of Ecuador
Amphibians of Panama
Amphibians described in 1898
Taxa named by George Albert Boulenger
Taxonomy articles created by Polbot